Dezhou is a prefecture-level city in northwestern Shandong province, People's Republic of China. It borders the provincial capital of Jinan to the southeast, Liaocheng to the southwest, Binzhou to the northeast, and the province of Hebei to the north.

History

Sulu Royal Family
The King of Sulu Paduka Pahala from the first royal family on Sulu before the Hashemites went on a tribute mission to the Ming dynasty Yongle Emperor. He died of natural causes in China and his two sons and wife were left in the care of Hui Muslims in Dezhou, Shandong. The two families descended from the two sons were given the surnames An and Wen by the Ming Emperors. They lived through the Ming and Qing dynasties and still live in Dezhou today.

The Kingdom of Sulu was converted to Islam, and the Hashemite Sharif ul-Hāshim of Sulu arrived in Sulu and married a princess of the previous non-Hashemite royal family, founding the Sulu Sultanate.

Tausug delegations from Sulu have visited Dezhou to see the descendants of the previous royal family.

Death of Empress Xiaoxianchun

Qianlong's first empress, Empress Xiaoxianchun, died on the 8th day of the 3rd month of the 13th year of Qianlong at the age of 37, on board a boat in Dezhou under circumstances that were not well documented by historical sources.

Administration

The municipality of Dezhou comprises thirteen county-level sub divisions:

Districts
Decheng District. The government of the prefecture-level city is located in this sub division.
Lingcheng District

Cities
Cities ( xianji shi) administered by Dezhou are:
Leling
Yucheng

Counties
Counties (县 xian) administered by Dezhou are:
Pingyuan
Xiajin
Wucheng
Qihe
Linyi
Ningjin
Qingyun

Development zones
Dezhou Economic Development District
Dezhou Yunhe Economic Development District

Climate

Transport

Historical 
The Yellow river and the Grand Canal runs through Dezhou, making it an important hub for cargo transit since antient times. It was described as "Junction of Nine Arteries" and "Portal of the Capital".

Modern Era 
Dezhou is connected via the Shijiazhuang-Dezhou railway, Shijiazhuang-Ji'nan HSR, Beijing-Shanghai railway, Beijing-Shanghai HSR. A small, single-track railway connects Dezhou with Dongying city as well.

The main expressway passing Dezhou is the G3 Beijing-Taipei Expressway, running north–south from it; other provincial expressways, as well as National Highway 104 and 105 offer connections in other directions for Dezhou

Tourism

Dezhou's biggest historical attraction is the tomb of Sultan Paduka Pahala of Sulu (Philippines), who died in Dezhou on his return journey from a visit to the Yongle Emperor in 1417. The tomb is well preserved and has been declared a national heritage site. Descendants of the sultan's Muslim followers still live in Dezhou today, and are classified as the Hui minority.

One of Dezhou's county Lingxian used to be a big county in China in history, when it was called Pingyuan County. Now part of the ancient city wall of Tang Dynasty still exists in the south of the region. Before the Three Kingdoms formed, one of the three emperors Liu Bei used to be the chief of the county, together with his fellows Guan Yu and Zhang Fei. In addition, it is the hometown of Dongfang Shuo, the most well-known adviser during the reign of Emperor Wu of Han ; In Tang Dynasty, a major figure of Chinese calligraphy, Yan Zhenqing, once took office as the administrator of the county. Today, a memorial hall for the two historic figures is built in the People's Park of Lingxian, where a lot of materials of Dongfang Shuo and stone inscriptions of Yan Zhenqing are preserved.

For tourist attractions, there is also a famous temple in Qingyun County. It's called Haidao Jinshan Temple, which is one of the biggest centers of Buddhism in Northern China. The most attractive scene is the underground aisle where the portrait of the hell is presented using high technology.

Industry
A new industrial zone hailed as the "Solar Valley" is being built for experimenting with clean-energy urban projects and massive use of household utilities such as solar-powered water-heaters. The Washington Post describes Dezhou's Solar Valley as the "clean-tech version of Silicon Valley".

Nowadays one of the biggest and most famous industries in Dezhou is solar energy industry, with two main corporations included—Himin Group and its partner Ecco Solar Group. Dezhou increased its international reputation when it was selected to follow previous hosts, Daegu, South Korea (2004), Oxford, UK (2006) and Adelaide, Australia (2008) as host of the 2010 International Solar City Congress. Himin Group has developed into the world's largest solar water heater manufacturer and is also discovering new areas such as photoelectricity.

Greenpeace China cited Dezhou in May 2009 as an example of how renewable energy can become a more common reality throughout the world.

Dezhou also houses the world's largest solar-powered office building, covering around 75,000 square meters.

Education
"Dezhou University"(also called Dezhou College, because it only offers undergraduate degree) is a comprehensive college which was approved by the National Education Committee in March 2000. It is the aggregation of Dezhou Teachers’ College, Dezhou Education College and Evening College Municipality, which has a 30-year history.

Notable people
 Dongfang Shuo (154 to 93 BC, The Western Han Dynasty), Writer and poet
 Yan Zhenqing (709 to 784, The Tang Dynasty),  Calligrapher, poet
 Ma Dehua (1945), actor, best known for his role as Zhu Bajie in the television series Journey to the West
 He Rong (1962), Vice President of the Supreme People's Court
 Han Hong (1971), Singer, songwriter, music producer, director
 Zhang Yuqi (1986), Chinese actress
 Ma Tianyu (1986), Chinese actor

Miscellaneous
Dezhou is well known for its braised chicken and watermelon.
The name of Dezhou is the same as the abbreviation of the Chinese name for the U.S. state of Texas.
Pingyuan, Dezhou is the foundation place of Yihetuan (Boxer Rebellion) against the Eight Power Allied Force during the 1900s.

Notes

References

Works cited

External links
德州鲁北热线
陵县旅游
Dezhou
Himin Group
Dezhou University 
Government website of Dezhou (in Simplified Chinese)

 
Cities in Shandong
Prefecture-level divisions of Shandong